

Cavenagh  is a locality in the Australian state of South Australia located about  north of the state capital of Adelaide and about  north-east of the municipal seat in Peterborough.

Cavenagh ’s boundaries were created on 31 August 2000 for the “local established name” which is derived from the cadastral unit of the Hundred of Cavenagh and which align with those of the hundred.  The locality includes the site of the now-ceased Government Town of Thornton which was gazetted on 1 December 1881 and which “ceased to exist” on 23 May 1963.

Land use within the locality is ’primary production’ and is concerned with “agricultural production and the grazing of stock on relatively large holdings.”

The 2016 Australian census which was conducted in August 2016 reports that Cavenagh had a population of four people.

Cavenagh is located within the federal division of Grey, the state electoral district of Stuart and the local government area of the District Council of Peterborough.

References

Towns in South Australia